Aztekium hintonii, is a species of cactus in the genus Aztekium. It is the second species of Aztekium discovered by George Sebastián Hinton in 1991.

Distribution 
Aztekium hintonii is endemic to Nuevo León.

Description 
The specimens are small solitary plants with green to greyish-green stem, up to 10 cm in diameter. The ribs are well defined, traversed by tiny wrinkles.

Cultivation 
Aztekium hintonii is easier to grow than Aztekium ritteri, but it is easy to lose during first years due to mistakes in cultivation.

References 

Cactoideae